Leaders were an American Christian metal band from Hollister, California. The band started making music in 2011, with members, lead vocalist, Lazarus Rios, lead guitarist, Alfredo Tovar, bass guitarist, JC Villareal, and drummer, Elijah Martinez. They signed with Facedown Records, where they released, Now We Are Free, a studio album, in 2012. Their second album, Indomitable, released by Facedown Records in 2013. Leaders disbanded on June 27, 2015.

Members
Final Lineup
Lazarus Rios - vocals (2011-2015)
Josh Reeves - guitar (2013-2015)
Jake Dirkson - bass (2013-2015)
Johnathen Somner - drums (2013-2015)
Former
Sam Campagna - guitar (2011)
Alfie Tovar - guitar (2011-2013)
J.C Villarreal- bass (2011-2013)
Elijah Martinez- drums (2011-2013)

Discography
Studio albums
 Now We Are Free (March 27, 2012, Facedown)
 Indomitable (September 3, 2013, Facedown)

References

External links
 

Facedown Records artists
Christian metal musical groups